Frieze is a contemporary art magazine, published eight times a year from London.

History
Frieze was founded in 1991 by Frieze Art Fair founders Amanda Sharp and Matthew Slotover with artist Tom Gidley. A Damien Hirst butterfly painting was featured in the first Frieze issue. When Frieze began both Sharp and Slotover served as editors, but ceased direct involvement in editorial decisions in 2001. In 2003, the year that Frieze Art Fair was founded, Sharp and Slotover assumed the roles of Publishing Directors of the magazine, and Directors of the fair. Sharp and Slotover maintain the overall direction of both the art fair and the magazine, but editorial decisions are made by the Editor Andrew Durbin and the Deputy Editor Amy Sherlock; Jennifer Higgie is the editor at large. In 2008, for the first time the talks programme at Frieze Art Fair was organised by the magazine editors.

In 2016, Endeavor – a Hollywood-based entertainment group – acquired a reported 70%-controlling stake in Frieze, which includes its publishing, art fair and music interests. The British executive Simon Fox, formerly CEO of Reach plc, was appointed the group's first CEO on 2 April 2020.

In 2021 Frieze magazine celebrated turning 30 with an online festival.

Frieze Foundation
The Frieze Foundation is a non-profit organisation established in 2003 as a spin-off of Frieze magazine and Frieze Art Fair. Funded by the European Commission’s Culture 2000 programme and Arts Council England, it supports contemporary art and is in charge of the curated programme at the Frieze Art Fair, comprising artist commissions, education, talks, films and music.

Bow Down podcast
Bow Down is a new podcast about significant women artists from the past. For each 20-minute episode, Jennifer Higgie—Frieze editor at large—invites an artist, writer, historian or curator to nominate an artist.

References

External links

 

Visual arts magazines published in the United Kingdom
Contemporary art magazines
Magazines published in London
Magazines established in 1991
1991 establishments in England
Eight times annually magazines published in the United Kingdom